The Club de Fútbol Cobras de Querétaro was a Mexican football team based in the city of Querétaro City, Querétaro.

History
Cobras was founded on 12 May 1980 as Cobras Querétaro, which was owned by television company Televisa. In 1985, the club acted as Club América's reserve team, while also pitching its veterans. Also in that year, it was first promoted to the top division after beating C.F. Pachuca with a score of 3–1. The stay would be however short-lived, as the team was immediately relegated, after collecting 31 points in 40 matches.

After Cobra's relegation, Alejandra de La Vega bought the club and moved it to Ciudad Juárez, meeting immediate success as it reached the Liga de Ascenso final that year and beat  Club León 1–0, in a game played at Estadio Azteca on 12 July 1988, with Joaquín Mendoza as manager.

In 1994, after the readjustments made in Primera División, Cobras folded, not being able to cope with serious economic problems. Seven years later, again as a feeder club – now to C.F. Monterrey – it was re-formed, playing and losing the 2003 promotion playoffs final, to Dorados de Culiacán.

Honors
Second Division: 2
1985–86, 1987–88
Runner-up (1): 2002–03

Mexican Cup: 1
1990–91

References

External links
Club info on Geocities

Defunct football clubs in Mexico
Football clubs in Querétaro
Association football clubs established in 1985
Ascenso MX teams
1985 establishments in Mexico
Querétaro City